Narlıdere is a village in the Mut district of Mersin Province, Turkey. The population of Narlıdere  was 154 as of 2012.

References

Villages in Mut District